The 1885–86 season was Morton Football Club's ninth season in which they competed at a national level, entering the Scottish Cup.

Fixtures and results

Scottish Cup

Renfrewshire Cup

Friendlies

References

External links
Greenock Morton FC official site

Greenock Morton F.C. seasons
Morton